Hsiao Ya-chuan (born 20 December 1967) is a Taiwanese film director.

Career
Born in 1967, Hsiao attended what later became Taipei National University of the Arts. Commenting on his upbringing in 2018, Hsiao stated, "My father’s frugality created a sense of insecurity in me, as if the family could run out of money anytime. There was a feeling of poverty, where we never had enough to do the same things other people could." He began working closely with Hou Hsiao-hsien, and served as assistant director on Hou's Flowers of Shanghai (1998). Hou has produced several of Hsiao's films, including  (2001), Taipei Exchanges (2010), and Father to Son (2018).

Hsiao first feature film, Mirror Image, won the Best Film Award at the 2001 Taipei Film Festival and another prize at the Fukuoka Film Festival. It was also shown at the Cannes Film Festival in May. The next year, Mirror Image was shown as the opening feature at the Taipei Film House. Hsiao worked for a time directing television commercials, before releasing Taipei Exchanges in 2010. The production, commissioned by the Taipei City Government, was shown at the Taipei Film Festival. In 2012, Hsiao directed Something’s Gotta Give, a segment of the anthology film , which screened at the Berlin International Film Festival and Stockholm International Film Festival. Hsiao's third feature film Father to Son was nominated for a 2018 VPRO Big Screen Award. It premiered at the 2018 International Film Festival Rotterdam.

Personal life
He has two children.

References

External links

1967 births
Living people
Taiwanese film directors
Taiwanese television directors
People from Changhua County
Taipei National University of the Arts alumni